Emil Staiger (8 February 1908, Kreuzlingen, Switzerland - 28 April 1987, Horgen, Switzerland) was a Swiss historian, writer, Germanist and Professor of German Studies at the University of Zurich.

Life 
After graduating from school, Emil Staiger first studied theology before switching to German and classical philology. After studying at the Universities of Geneva, Zurich and Munich, he received his doctorate in Zurich in 1932 with a thesis on Annette von Droste-Hülshoff.  From 1932 to 1934 he was a member of the National Front (Switzerland), from which he publicly distanced himself in 1935.  In 1934 he completed his time at the University of Zurich with a thesis on Schelling, Hegel and Hölderlin. That same year, he became a private lecturer in German literature at Zurich.  In 1943, he was appointed to a professorship.  Staiger's importance in the field of German literature was founded in his widely acclaimed publications Die Zeit als Einbildkraft des Dichters (1939), Basic Concepts of Poetics (1946), The Art of Interpretation (1955) and in his three-volume Goethe Studies (1952–1959).

Critical style 
Staiger's style of literary criticism was opposed to extra-literary concepts such as positivism and intellectual history, sociology or psychoanalysis. For Staiger, concentration on the literary texts themselves was most important. He wrote that “the poet's word, the word for its own sake, is valid, nothing behind it, about or below it". This sensitive interpretation method, often described with the saying “understand what grabs us”, developed into a distinct Germanic style of studying literature.  His work, The Art of Interpretation describes his method of literary criticism.

Influence 
Staiger's 11 o'clock lectures, which inspired students from all over Europe as well as the literary public to attend, were spoken about far beyond the University of Zurich. At the same time Staiger was a renowned translator of ancient and modern languages, and translated Aeschylus, Sophocles, Euripides, Virgil, Tasso, Poliziano and Milton into German. As a controversial theater and music critic as well as a columnist, he influenced Zurich's cultural life for decades. He wrote a column for the Neue Zürcher Zeitung, a Swiss German-language newspaper.

Prizes 

 Gottfried-Keller Prize, 1962
Nominated for the Nobel Prize in Literature, 1964
 Sigmund Freud Prize for scientific prose, 1966
 Zurich Literature Prize, 1966
 Pour le Mérite for science and the arts, 1966
 Corresponding member of the British Academy, 1971
 Austrian Decoration of Honor for Science and Art, 1975

Notes

External links 
 Staiger, Emil, entry in the Historical Dictionary of Switzerland
 Staiger, Emil at Yale

1908 births
1987 deaths
Academic staff of the University of Zurich
Swiss literary critics
Swiss philologists
German literary criticism
Swiss translators
People from Kreuzlingen
Corresponding Fellows of the British Academy